Iggie's House is a 1970 young adult novel by Judy Blume. The story concerns Winnie, whose best friend Iggie has moved away. The new family moving into Iggie's house are the first African-American  people in the neighborhood. While Winnie is quick to make friends with the new kids, she realizes that some people, possibly including her own parents, have trouble seeing past a person's color.

Plot summary
Winnie Barringer is heartbroken over her close friend Iggie's move to Tokyo, Japan.  However, she immediately takes an interest in the black family that has relocated in Iggie's old house, the Garbers, who have moved to her neighborhood (in an unspecified location) from Detroit, and prioritizes befriending the family's three children, Glenn, Herbie, and Tina, over all else. Her first meeting with the Garber children is awkward and nearly disastrous as she brings up racist subjects inadvertently, but she tries to overcome this by continuing to bond with them, despite several major bumps in the road along the way — most notably her snobby, prejudiced neighbor Mrs. Landon's callous attempts at running the Garbers out of town because of their race.

After Mrs. Landon and her daughter Clarice leave a sign on the Garbers' lawn telling them they are unwanted and to leave town, Winnie fears that the Garbers will move again, and becomes extremely disappointed in her parents (especially her mother, who appears to demonstrate racism equal to Mrs. Landon's, albeit in more subtle ways) for not standing up for the Garbers.  Eventually Mrs. Landon decides to sell her house and move away herself for no reason other than her prejudice, and attempts to pressure her neighbors into doing the same. This proves to be the last straw for Winnie's father, who thoroughly excoriates Mrs. Landon for her intolerance and tells her there will be no blockbusting in their neighborhood. Although she is proud of her father for telling Mrs. Landon off, Winnie fears that her parents will follow Mrs. Landon's lead, and decides to stow away on a ship to Japan to live with Iggie's family as she would be ashamed of having racist parents.

In the end, Winnie's parents decide not to move but only, Winnie's mother tells her, because "moving is too much trouble," not because they wish to befriend the Garbers.  Winnie is again disappointed by her mother's attitudes but is glad to see her father is being more receptive to the idea of being a good neighbor to the Garbers. She also realizes that she herself has a long way to go, and decides to work on becoming a real friend to the Garbers.

Characters

Winifred "Winnie" Bates Barringer - A tomboyish girl about to start sixth grade. She is the protagonist of the novel.
Paul and Helen Barringer - Winnie's parents.
The Garbers - The African-American family who move into Iggie's old house:
Glenn - The oldest boy, Winnie's age (sixth grade), who is mild-mannered and level-headed.
Herbie - The younger boy, starting fifth grade, who is more dramatic, angry, and sarcastic.
Tina - The youngest girl, eight years old, who is sensitive and looks up to her older brothers and Winnie.
Dorothy Landon - The snotty and rude neighbor who is most adamant about getting the Garbers out of the neighborhood.
Clarice Landon - Mrs. Landon's prissy daughter, whom Winnie despises but eventually feels sorry for due to her mother.

See also

 White flight

External links
Judy Blume's website

1970 American novels
Novels by Judy Blume
American young adult novels
1970 debut novels